Giulvăz (Banat Swabian: Djulwess) is a commune in Timiș County, Romania. It is composed of four villages: Crai Nou, Giulvăz (commune seat), Ivanda and Rudna.

Geography 
Giulvăz is located in the southwestern part of the Timiș County. It borders Peciu Nou to the north; Ciacova to the east and southeast, the limit on a great length being the Timiș River; Foeni and Uivar to the west and southwest. The territory of the commune lies in the middle of a low plain area, Ciacova Plain, with altitudes between 80–90 m.

The climate is characterized by average annual temperatures of 10–11 °C, average temperatures of –2 °C in January and 22–24 °C in July. The average annual rainfall is 500–600 mm. The dominant winds are those from the north, northeast, east and southeast.

The dominant vegetation is the grassy one. The areas with trees and shrubs are few, located especially in the Timiș meadow. The characteristic fauna is that of the steppe represented by rodents such as: suslik, hamster, vole, mole, etc. The birds found here are: sparrow, quail, starling, rook, northern goshawk, magpie, etc. The hunting fauna is represented by hares, pheasants, wild geese and ducks, deer and wild boars.

History 
The first recorded mention of Giulvăz dates from 1355. It was inhabited uninterruptedly, during the Middle Ages and the Turkish occupation of Banat. In Marsigli's writings of 1690–1700, it is mentioned and said to have 27 houses. On Count Mercy's map of 1723 it appears with the name Julves, rounded to the district of Ciacova, and on the military map of 1761 it is listed as a rather important locality. In 1779 it joined the Torontál County to which it belonged until the end of World War I. In 1781 it was bought by the Macedo-Romanians Naum and Constantin Dadan, and later, it remained in the property of the latter. Dadan Hungarianizes and becomes Dadányi. From him, the property is inherited by Count Kinsky, who parcels it in 1909.

Demographics 

Giulvăz had a population of 3,075 inhabitants at the 2011 census, up 2% from the 2002 census. Most inhabitants are Romanians (79.97%), larger minorities being represented by Serbs (6.44%), Roma (5.5%), Hungarians (1.63%) and Germans (1.04%). For 5.01% of the population, ethnicity is unknown. By religion, most inhabitants are Orthodox (79.84%), but there are also minorities of Pentecostals (7.09%), Roman Catholics (3.54%) and Serbian Orthodox (2.41%). For 5.76% of the population, religious affiliation is unknown.

Economy 
The basic economic activities of Giulvăz are agriculture and animal husbandry, activities favored by the commune's position in the middle of a plain area. Out of the total surface of the commune, 92.75% is agricultural territory in use, with 74.1% arable lands and 22.4% pastures. The agricultural area per inhabitant is 3.5 ha/inhab.

References 

Communes in Timiș County
Localities in Romanian Banat